The 2016 Supercupa României was the 18th edition of Romania's season opener cup competition. The game was contested between Liga I title holders, Astra Giurgiu, and Romanian Cup holders, CFR Cluj. It was played at Cluj Arena in Cluj-Napoca in July. Astra won the trophy for the second time in its history, after defeating CFR Cluj with 1–0

Match

Details

References

External links
Romania - List of Super Cup Finals, RSSSF.com

2016–17 in Romanian football
Supercupa României
CFR Cluj matches
FC Astra Giurgiu matches